Zhijiang Campus is an urban campus of Zhejiang University located in Hangzhou, Zhejiang, China.  Located on riverside of the Qiantang River and close to the Liuhe Pagoda, it was the oldest university campus in Hangzhou. Built as the campus of Hangchow University, one of the oldest Christian colleges and universities in China, most of its buildings are protected as the Hangchow University Historic Site under the list of Major Sites Protected at the National Level. The campus is now home to James D. Watson Institute of Genome Sciences, Guanghua Law School and the Institute for Advanced Study in Humanities and Social Sciences.

History 
The planning of the campus began in 1906, in which year, four foreign missionaries of Presbyterian Church in the United States of America, each based in Hangzhou, Ningbo, Shanghai and Suzhou, along with a representative of the faculty of Hangchow Presbyterian College formed a board of directors. The first meeting of the board was held in November, during which the board resolved to build a new campus outside the urban area of Hangzhou. After the meeting, the college slowly purchased the land of the campus, until the construction began in 1909. As a member of the board and a representative of the churn in Hangzhou, John Leighton Stuart was a major participator during planning and construction, along with his family in Hangzhou. His brother Warren Horton Stuart taught at the college and served as the president of the college from 1916 to 1922, who lived in the Paxton Residence on the campus with his family. 

The construction was finished in two phases. With Phase 1 most finished in the Winter of 1910, Hangchow Presbyterian College moved into the campus from Dataer Lane in the city centre of Hangzhou in February 1911. The Chinese name of the college was changed from Yuying (育英, literally nurturing the elites) to Zhijiang (之江, literally the Qiantang River, which the campus is upon) after the relocation. In 1914, the college was renamed as Hangchow Christian College in English. In Chinese, it was renamed as Zhijiang University (之江大学).

After the relocation, new buildings continued to be built in the campus. In 1913, the Philadelphia Observatory was built. A wooden bridge was built over the stream in the campus in 1916. In 1918, the Tooker Memorial Chapel was built, along with the systems of tap water and electricity. As the Sino-Japanese war hit Hangzhou in 1937, the Philadelphia Observatory was destroyed by Japanese bombing and the university moved away from Hangzhou to evade the war. During the wartime period, the campus was in poor maintenance. When the university returned to the campus after the war, a major renovation began in March 1946.

In 1951, the university ceased to operate under the new Communist rule, with the American faculty moving to Hong Kong to found Chung Chi College and the campus taken over by the Department of Culture and Education of Zhejiang Provincial Government. During the 1952 reorganisation of Chinese higher education systems, the university was cancelled, with the campus taken over by Zhejiang Teachers College. In 1958, with the merger of Zhejiang Teachers College and Hangzhou University, the campus was reassigned to the Party School of the Zhejiang Provincial Committee of Chinese Communist Party. In 1961, the campus was gained by Zhejiang University. The campus was once renamed as Zhijiang College of Zhejiang University in 1996, but was later renamed as Zhijiang Campus. 

In 2002, Zeng Xianzi Teaching Building was built with the 4 million Hong Kong dollar donation from Hong Kong businessman Tsang Hin-chi. In 2006, the old buildings built by Hangchow University was listed as a Major Historical and Cultural Site Protected at the National Level by the State Council, with the name Former Site of Hangchow University. In 2007, a major renovation of the campus began.

Architectural designs 
The campus was built in Mount Qingwang upon the Qiantang River, with a total area of 650 mu and a total building area of 70,000 m2. Characterised by redbrick buildings, the campus is considered one of the most beautiful university campuses in China. The campus is American styled, with campus buildings adopting both traditional Chinese and western architectural styles and a central garden where Sun Yat-sen made a public speech on 10 December 1912 during his visit to the university. Severance Hall used to have a Chinese-styled rooftop, which was replaced a hip roof in the 1946 renovation. The Paxton Residence and the North Pacific Residence are major residences in the campus, which are characterised by classical architectural features, including round arches, red brick exteriors and an arcade. The Tooker Memorial Chapel, a grey neo-Gothic building, was the only religious building in the campus. Zeng Xianzi Teaching Building, designed by the Architectural Design & Research Institute Of Zhejiang University (UAD), used similar red bricks as a major building materials, to mimic the styles of the historical buildings in the campus.

Institutions 

 Faculty of Social Sciences:
 Guanghua Law School
 Institute for Advanced Study in Humanities and Social Sciences
 James D. Watson Institute of Genome Sciences

In popular culture 

 The 2010 movie Aftershock was shot on location within the campus to mimic a Chinese university life in the 1980s. Hangzhou Medical School, where the heroine of the movie, played by Zhang Jingchu, studies, was filmed on the campus, which made the Economics Building of the campus a popular tourist attraction.
 The 2015 movie The Left Ear was filmed on the campus.
 Janet Fitch wrote an autobiography which describes her life in the campus from 1909 to 1935.

See also 

 Hangchow University
 Zhejiang University

References 

Zhijiang Campus, Zhejiang University
Tourist attractions in Hangzhou